Yummy FTP Pro is an FTP client for macOS made by Yummy Software. It supports FTP/S, SFTP and WebDAV/S. It is noted for its speed and reliability, and automation capability using AppleScript.

Its programmer died in August 2018 and there seems to be no-one continuing his work. As the program is 32 bit, it will fail to work starting with macOS 10.15 Catalina.

See also
Comparison of FTP client software

Further reading
Entry on The Mac Orchard
Editors' review of Yummy FTP on CNET
Short Yummy FTP review on The Unofficial Apple Weblog (TUAW)
Mac OS X FTP Clients Throwdown on TheAppleBlog
Review of Yummy FTP on Mac The Web
Yummy FTP review on Macworld UK

References

External links
Yummy Software

Macintosh-only software
FTP clients